Boussé is a town located in the province of Kourwéogo in Burkina Faso. It is the capital of Kourwéogo Province.

References

Populated places in the Plateau-Central Region